Aquipluma is a facultatively anaerobic genus of bacteria from the family of Prolixibacteraceae with one known species (Aquipluma nitroreducens). Aquipluma nitroreducens has the ability to reduce nitrate.

References

Bacteroidia
Bacteria genera
Monotypic bacteria genera
Taxa described in 2020